Payrav Sulaymoni (1899 – 1933), also transliterated as Pairaw Sulaimani, was a Tajik writer and poet from Samarkand. A reformer of traditional Tajik poetic metrics.

References
Iraj Bashiri, Prominent Tajik Figures of the Twentieth Century, International Borbad Foundation, Academy of Sciences of Tajikistan, Dushanbe, 2003.

See also

Tajik literature

Soviet male poets
20th-century Tajikistani poets
Tajikistani male writers
1899 births
1933 deaths
20th-century poets
People from Samarkand
People from Samarkand Oblast